Roser Bru Llop (15 February 1923 – 26 May 2021) was a Spanish-born Chilean painter and engraver associated with the neo-figurative art movement.

Biography

Roser Bru was born in Barcelona in 1923. The following year her family went into exile in Paris, France, as a result of the dictatorship of Miguel Primo de Rivera. After the Spanish Civil War, in 1939, she moved back to France, where she embarked for Chile on the SS Winnipeg. She arrived in Valparaíso on 3 September of that year.

In 1957 she began her engraving studies at Taller 99, directed by Nemesio Antúnez.

Roser Bru died in Santiago on 26 May 2021 at the age of 98.

Recognition
In 1995 Bru was decorated by King Juan Carlos I of Spain when she was named Commander of the Order of Isabella the Catholic.

In 2000 she received the Altazor Award of the National Arts in the Painting category for Enseñanzas de Goya. In 2013 she won  in the same category for Vivir en obra. In 2004 she received a nomination in the Engraving and Drawing category for Un conjunto de sus 34 grabados en su cumpleaños número ochenta. In 2005 she received another nomination in the same category for Obra en exposición Pablo Neruda, la infancia del poeta.

In 2005 she was granted the Pablo Neruda Order of Artistic and Cultural Merit.

In 2015, the Government of Chile awarded her the National Prize for Plastic Arts.

References

External links

 
 

1923 births
2021 deaths
20th-century Chilean painters
20th-century engravers
21st-century engravers
21st-century Chilean painters
20th-century Chilean women artists
21st-century Chilean women artists
Chilean women painters
Commanders of the Order of Isabella the Catholic
Naturalized citizens of Chile
Painters from Barcelona
Spanish emigrants to Chile
Academic staff of the Pontifical Catholic University of Chile
University of Chile alumni
Women engravers